Mycena luxaeterna, commonly known as the eternal light mushroom, is a species of fungus in the family Mycenaceae. The gills are attached. The mushroom has a slightly radish-like smell and similar slightly bitter taste.

Habitat
The mushroom was discovered in a very limited area of the Atlantic rain forest of São Paulo, Brazil and is known to exist only at this location. It grows on decomposing twigs, rarely on dead leaves or undergrowth, in clusters of two-to-twenty individuals.  Dennis Desjardin is credited with the discovery.

Uses
The eternal light mushroom has no known nutritional value, contains no known hallucinogens, and is not reported as having any particular cultural significance. Its extreme rarity means that it has never been common in cooking.

See also
List of bioluminescent fungi

References

Bioluminescent fungi
luxaeterna
Fungi described in 2010
Fungi of Brazil